Yama-Con is an annual three-day anime convention with multigenre elements held during November/December at the LeConte Center in Pigeon Forge, Tennessee. Yama-Con's name comes from the Japanese word for mountain, "Yama."

Programming
The convention typically offers an Artists' Alley, ball, concerts, costume contests, dances, exhibits, game rooms, gaming tournaments, karaoke, Maid/Butler Cafe, replicas, vendor space, and workshops. The 2015 and 2016 charity auction benefited Pets Without Parents, and in 2015 raised $2,800.

History
The first event at the Smoky Mountain Convention Center in 2012 was held in December due to the month having few other conventions. Yama-Con used hotel rooms for their Video Gaming areas and tents for event space in 2013. Complaints occurred due to the use of tents in the cold and wet weather. The convention moved to the LeConte Center in Pigeon Forge in 2014 due to outgrowing its old space. Yama-Con located its programming for adults 18 and up at the Smoky Mountain Convention Center in 2016. Yama-Con 2020 was cancelled due to the COVID-19 pandemic. The convention had a dress code for 2021.

Event history

References

External links
 Yama-Con Website

Anime conventions in the United States
Recurring events established in 2012
Annual events in Tennessee
Festivals in Tennessee
Tourist attractions in Sevier County, Tennessee
Pigeon Forge, Tennessee
Conventions in Tennessee